Cornelis Matelief de Jonge (c. 1569 – October 17, 1632) was a Dutch admiral who was active in establishing Dutch power in Southeast Asia during the beginning of the 17th century. His fleet was officially on a trading mission, but its true intent was to destroy Portuguese power in the area. The fleet had 1400 men on board, including 600 soldiers. Matelieff did not succeed in this.  The Dutch would ultimately gain control of Malacca more than thirty years later, again joining forces with the Sultanate of Johor, and a new ally Aceh, in 1641.  He was born and died in Rotterdam.

Account 

Born in Rotterdam, Matelief was put in command of a fleet of eleven ships of the Dutch East India Company with the destination of Malacca.  Malacca then was an inconvenient stronghold for non-Portuguese ships heading for the Indonesian Archipelago, China or Japan. The fleet set sail from Zeeland on May 12, 1605. It was the third (?) such fleet from the Dutch East Indies Company to visit Malacca.  Matelieff met with Steven van der Hagen on the island of Mauritius for a briefing in January 1606.  As one of the first, Matelieff described the black rat, the dodo and the macaque monkey.  Also his description of the vegetation of the island are most important.

He reached Malacca in April 1606.  In May Matelief de Jonge formed a formal pact with the ruler of Johor, Sultan Alauddin Riayat Shah III, to expel the Portuguese. In exchange, the Dutch would get Malacca for themselves and would be able to conduct trade with Johor. The Dutch and the Malay also agreed to tolerate each other's religion.

First battle of Malacca (August 1606)

Matelief laid siege to the Portuguese-held Malacca for several months, but was repulsed on land by Portuguese troops under André Furtado de Mendonça and their allies, a contingent of Japanese samurai from Red seal ships. A very large Portuguese fleet under Dom Martim Afonso de Castro, the Viceroy of Goa, arrived on the scene with twenty Portuguese ships on August 14, 1606.

The two fleets fought from August 17. Nassau was boarded by Santa Cruz and Nossa Senhora da Conceição. Matelief, onboard Orange, went to the rescue but collided with another Dutch ship, Middelburg. These two ships were then attacked by São Salvador and Dom Duarte de Guerra's galleon. Orange managed to break free, but the two Portuguese ships and the Middelburg all caught fire and sank in the action. The Santa Cruz and Conceição eventually managed to set the Nassau on fire, leading to an explosion that sank her.

Matelief decided to withdraw from the action, with 150 dead on the Dutch side, and around 500 on the Portuguese side. On August 19, 1606, he obtained permission from the Sultan of Johor to anchor his fleet for repairs in the Johor River.

Second battle of Malacca (Sept. 1606)
Matelief came back to the scene of the first battle about a month later. Castro had sailed away, leaving only ten Portuguese ships before Malacca. Matelief attacked the ships and managed to sink or burn every single one of them, on September 21, 1606. At the end of his trip Matelieff had lost six ships.

Matelieff sailed in one ship from Ternate to Canton, and on June 4, 1607, he captured a Chinese junk, loaded with spices from Banda. When six Portuguese ships under André Pessoa showed up in front of the Chinese coast, he went back, without an agreement with China or reaching Japan.  Matelieff arrived unsuccessfully on Bantam on November 24, 1607, and sent Willem Jansz with secret instructions to Banda to forestall the English ships. He left Bantam on January 28, 1608

Return to Europe with a Siamese embassy (1608)

Matelieff returned to Europe in 1608 with Cornelius Specx, a Dutchman who had established a factory in Ayutthaya in 1604.  Together with them was an embassy of 16 peoples from the Kingdom of Siam sent by the Siamese ruler Ekathotsarot. The embassy was brought to Holland by Matelief onboard Orange. They arrived in The Hague on September 10, 1608. There the embassy met with Maurice of Nassau, Prince of Orange. Following this, a treaty was concluded between the Dutch Republic and Siam in 1617.

In 1618 Matelieff was appointed in the vroedschap of Rotterdam, later as a burgemeester of the city. In 1625 he lost his function as a deputy in the States-General when staying too long in Warsaw.

Notes

Further reading

 Bijlsma, R., "De discoursen van Cornelis Matelieff de Jonge over den staat van Oost-Indië", Nederlandsch Archievenblad, 35 (1927–8), I: 49–53.
 Borschberg, Peter, Journal, Memorials and Letters of Cornelis Matelieff de Jonge. Security, Diplomacy and Commerce in 17th Century Southeast Asia, Singapore NUS Press, 2015. https://www.academia.edu/4302783
 Borschberg, Peter, Hugo Grotius, the Portuguese and Free Trade in the East Indies, Singapore: NUS Press and KITLV Press, 2011. https://www.academia.edu/4302729
 Borschberg, Peter, The Singapore and Melaka Straits: Violence, Security and Diplomacy in the 17th Century, Singapore: NUS Press and KITLV Press, 2010. https://www.academia.edu/4302722
 Borschberg, Peter, Admiral Matelieff's Singapore and Johor, 1606-1616, Singapore: NAS, 2015. https://www.academia.edu/11868450
 Borschberg, Peter, "The value of Matelieff's writings for the study of Southeast Asia, c.1600-1620," Journal of Southeast Asian Studies 48, 3 (2017): 414-435. DOI: https://doi.org/10.1017/S002246341700056X
 Boxer, Charles Ralph. The Affair of the Madre de Deus: A Chapter in the History of the Portuguese in Japan, London, K. Paul, Trench, Trubner & co., ltd., 1929.
 Frederiks, J.G., 'Cornelis Cornelisz Matelieff de Jonge en zijn geslagt", Rotterdamsche Historiebladen, 3 afd., 1.1. (1871): 204–357.
 l’Hermite, J. (de Jonge), Breeder verhael ende klare beschrijvinghe van tghene den Admiral Cornelis Matelief de Jonge inde Oost-Indien voor de stadt Malacca, ende int belegh der zelver wedervaren is: als ooc den vreesselijcke strijdt ter zee, tusschen den admirael voorsz. ende de Portugijsen, ende andere geschiedenissen meer. Overgeschreven bij eenen der commisen inde vlote, Rotterdam: Jan Janssz., 1608.
 Matelieff de Jonge, C., Historiale ende ware beschrijvinge vande reyse des admiraels Cornelis Matelief de Jonghe, near de Oost-Indien, wtghetrocken in Mayo 1605. Midsgaders de belegeringhe voor Malacca, also ooc den slach ter zee teghen de Portugijsche armade, ende andere discourssen, Rotterdam: By Jan Jansz, 1608.

1560s births
1632 deaths
Sailors on ships of the Dutch East India Company
17th-century Dutch military personnel
17th-century Dutch East Indies people
Admirals of the navy of the Dutch Republic
Military personnel from Rotterdam
People of the Dutch–Portuguese War
Dutch East India Company people from Rotterdam